Anglo-Chinese School (Barker Road) is a government-aided boys' secondary school located at Barker Road in Newton, Singapore. It is a member of the Anglo-Chinese family of schools in Singapore. It offers the Singapore-Cambridge GCE Ordinary Level course for its students from Sec 1 to Sec 4/5. Students may then move on to Anglo-Chinese Junior College or Anglo-Chinese School (Independent). It has provided opportunities for its feeder students to continue with an ACS Education at a secondary level. ACS was also the first school in Singapore to have a flower named after it, the Ascocenda Anglo-Chinese School orchid, a hybrid created by the school to mark its 116th Founder's Day on 1 March 2002. ACS has many partner schools such as Anglo-Chinese School (Junior) and Anglo Chinese Junior College. The school is close to Newton MRT station.

It was a full school which subsumed Anglo-Chinese School (Primary) as its primary school section until 1998, when the school split into two. The school has been based at the newly rebuilt Barker Road campus since 2003. Its principal is Loo Ming Yaw while long-serving principal Ng Eng Chin is now retired and Peter Tan Chong Tze is now heading Queensway Secondary School.

Barker Road campus 

In 1999, ACS (Barker Road) moved out of the campus after a closing ceremony on 4 November, to allow the campus to be redeveloped. An issue developed after plans were revealed to dismantle the historic Art Deco clock tower facing Dunearn Road due to safety concerns. This conflict was resolved and the dismantling went ahead. A replica now stands 20 metres from the old clock tower, with the original clock mechanism installed in the new tower.

The 5.2-hectare campus now contains the primary and secondary blocks of ACS (Primary) and ACS (Barker Road) respectively. In between the primary and secondary buildings is an administrative block housing the administrative office as well as the two libraries. The landscaped, open-air Student Plaza links the three buildings together. The cafeteria, bookstore, CCA rooms and Music Studios are one floor below the Plaza. The Arts Centre contains the Mrs Lee Choon Guan Concert Hall, Tan Cheng Siong Drama Theatre and the Lee Kong Chian Auditorium which can seat 830, 270 and 1,200 respectively.

The sports complex also sits on the campus, containing the Shaw Pool and the Tan Chin Tuan Sports Hall. The Sports Hall has three basketball courts, a racket centre, full recreational facilities including a gym and changing rooms. The Olympic-size pool has eight lanes. The Transport Centre/carpark is below the complex.

Barker Road Methodist Church and the Methodist Centre (housing the Methodist Church in Singapore) have also been relocated to the redeveloped Barker Road campus. ACS Oldham Hall has also been renovated with improved facilities, such as air-conditioning in some rooms, a cafeteria, and the capacity to house 500 borders. The Barker Road campus was designed by SAA Architects Pte and the entire project cost was S$95 million, of which S$15 million had to be raised by the school. In 2004, the campus won the CIDB Award for Construction Excellence.

Construction is underway for a new sports facility featuring two indoor sports halls and an artificial field, known as the AstroTurf. Along with this, a new 7-story building is being built for academic purposes, near the site of the clock tower. Construction was expected to be completed by the end of 2020, however due to Covid-19 the project was delayed.

Notable alumni 
 Nathan Hartono, singer-songwriter

See also 
Anglo-Chinese School
Anglo-Chinese School (International)
Anglo-Chinese School (Independent)
Anglo-Chinese Junior College

References 
 Earnest Lau and Peter Teo, The ACS Story, 
 ECHO Magazine, Oct-Dec 2004

External links 

Anglo-Chinese School (Barker Road)

Anglo-Chinese School
Methodist schools
Secondary schools in Singapore
Educational institutions established in 1998
Novena, Singapore
Clock towers in Singapore
1998 establishments in Singapore
Schools in Central Region, Singapore